Aman Ke Farishtey (also titled Aman Ke Farisshtey) is an Indian action film directed by Kader Kashmiri and produced by Pravin Kotak and Sohan Bhatia  under banner of Sohan Art International. The film stars Dev Anand, Hema Malini, Javed Jaffrey, Aasif Sheikh and Ekta Sohini in pivotal roles along with Roopa Ganguly, Kiran Kumar and Kader Khan in supporting roles.

Cast 
Dev Anand as Paramveer
Hema Malini as Geeta (Paramveer's Wife)
Javed Jaffrey as Amar
Aasif Sheikh as Vikram
Ekta Sohini as Reeta
Roopa Ganguly as Rupa
Kiran Kumar as Sher Singh
Kader Khan as Colonel Ranjeet

Soundtrack

Box office 

References

External links 
 
 

Films about terrorism in India
Films set in Mumbai
Indian action drama films
Indian action thriller films
2010s Hindi-language films
2016 action drama films
2016 action thriller films
Hindi-language action films